"Murphy's Law" is a song recorded by Irish singer Róisín Murphy. It was officially released on 4 March 2020, serving as the fifth single from Murphy's fifth solo studio album, Róisín Machine, released later that year. Written by Murphy, Dean Honer, Michael Ward and Richard Barratt, with song also produced by the latter, "Murphy's Law" lyrically refers to the adage of the same name in a scenario where Murphy unintentionally runs into a former lover.

Background and recording
In an interview with Billboard, Murphy said "Murphy's Law" was the only track from the album they wrote and recorded in the studio together, with the others being more remote. After deciding a song about Murphy's law worked well as a disco track, she and the song's co-writers "tied it up with singing about Sheffield", where Murphy first ventured into music, "and leaving a small town and going and making myself [...] that part of your life where you make yourself, where it comes time to do your own nurturing and decisions."

According to Murphy, the track was probably the most difficult song on the album to finish: "We were there writing it thinking, 'it's cheesy, but it's so strong.' So we kept going with it. The whole track was in a different key, I kept singing it and it never felt right, and then I said, 'well, stick it in another key and transpose it and I'll re-sing it.' So he [Barratt] transposed it and we got this gender-bent vocal sound going and we haven't replaced it because we couldn't live without it. It felt like a perfect foil against the song."

Live performances
Murphy first performed the track live on The Graham Norton Show on 2 October 2020. Industry title Music Week noted her appearance on the chat show amid record labels vying for reduced music performance slots, due to the impact of the coronavirus pandemic on television programming. During her tour in support of the album, Murphy instead performed "We Are the Law" (a remixed mashup with "We Got Together"), taken from her remix album Crooked Machine.

Track listing

Single version
"Murphy's Law" (Extended Mix) – 8:00
"Murphy's Law" (Edit) – 3:50

Album version
"Murphy's Law" – 6:51

Crooked Mixes

"Murphy's Law" (Crooked Cowbelly 1) – 8:57
"Murphy's Law" (Crooked Cowbelly 2) – 8:01
"Murphy's Law" (Murphy's Big Dub) – 11:05
"Murphy's Law" (Murphy's Tones) – 9:53

Cosmodelica Remix
"Murphy's Law" (Cosmodelica Remix) – 7:43
"Murphy's Law" (Cosmodelica Remix) [Edit] – 3:56

Credits and personnel
Credits are adapted from the liner notes of Róisín Machine.

 Róisín Murphy – songwriter, lead vocals
 Richard Barratt – songwriter, producer
 Dean Honer – songwriter, additional engineering
 Michael Ward – songwriter, backing vocals
 David Lewin – engineer

 Randy Merrill – mastering
 Rhianna Kenny – backing vocals
 Nesreen Shah – backing vocals
 Philly Smith – backing vocals

Charts

Release history

References

Róisín Murphy songs
Songs written by Róisín Murphy
2020 songs